SDO may stand for:

Science and technology 

Scattered disc object in the Solar System
Selective door operation on trains
Service Data Object protocol under the CANopen protocol
Service Data Objects, allowing uniform data access
Social dominance orientation, a personality trait
Solar Dynamics Observatory, a NASA mission to study the Sun
Spatial Data Option, late Oracle Spatial and Graph
Standards Developing Organization
Subdwarf O star (sdO)
Intel Secure Device Onboard for IoT

Other uses 

San Diego Opera, California, US
SDO Bussum, a Dutch association football club